Logan Layne Tanner (born November 10, 2000) is an American professional baseball catcher in the Cincinnati Reds organization.

Amateur career
Tanner attended George County High School in Lucedale, Mississippi. As a sophomore in 2017, he batted .305 with three home runs while also going 4-3 with a 1.22 ERA. He batted .341 with twenty RBIs alongside posting a 1.64 ERA and 114 strikeouts as a junior in 2018. Unselected in the 2019 Major League Baseball draft, he enrolled at Mississippi State University to play college baseball, where he committed to as a junior.

As a freshman at Mississippi State in 2020, Tanner appeared in 14 games and batted .268 with two home runs before the season was cancelled due to the COVID-19 pandemic. In 2021, as a redshirt freshman, he was the Bulldogs' starting catcher and slashed .287/.382/.525 with team-high 15 home runs and 53 RBIs over 67 games, leading Mississippi State to their first ever NCAA Championship. After the season, he was named to the USA Baseball Collegiate National Team. As a redshirt sophomore in 2022, Tanner returned as the Bulldogs' starting catcher and entered the season as a top prospect for the upcoming draft. Over 55 games, he batted .285 with seven home runs and 38 RBIs and earned spots on the All-SEC Second Team and the All-Defensive Team. Following the season's end, he traveled to San Diego where he participated in the Draft Combine.

Professional career
Tanner was selected by the Cincinnati Reds in the second round with the 55th overall pick of the 2022 Major League Baseball draft. He signed with the team for $1 million. He made his professional debut with the Arizona Complex League Reds and was promoted to the Daytona Tortugas after one game. Over 17 games between the two teams, he hit .200 with one home run and seven RBIs.

Personal life
Tanner's mother, Dalenah, played college softball for the Southern Miss Golden Eagles and was a member of the only two teams in the program's history to make the Women's College World Series in 1999 and 2000. Tanner’s father, Brandon Barthel, played college baseball as a pitcher for the University of Southern Mississippi, Delgado Community College, and the University of New Orleans.

References

External links
Mississippi State Bulldogs bio

2000 births
Living people
Baseball players from Mississippi
Baseball catchers
Mississippi State Bulldogs baseball players
United States national baseball team players
Arizona Complex League Reds players
Daytona Tortugas players